Lingdingyang or Lingding Channel is the middle channel of the Pearl River estuary which runs from Humen to Jiuzhouyang. Humen separates Lingdingyang and Shiziyang, the upper channel of the Pearl River Estuary, in the north and Jiuzhouyang, the lower channel of the Pearl River Estuary at the eastern tip of Taipa, from the western tip of Lantau all the way to the southern end of the Wanshan Archipelago. Currently, Hong Kong–Zhuhai–Macau Bridge (HZMB), a bridge and tunnel across Lingdingyang with the Shenzhen–Zhongshan Bridge, crosses the channel.

References

Straits of China
Geography of Zhuhai
Bodies of water of Guangdong